American Book Company is a textbook and software publishing company. Its main focus is on standardized test preparation materials. It offers books covering language arts, mathematics, science, and social studies tests. The company also produces transparencies, basic review books, and ACT and SAT preparation books.

It currently publishes nearly 200 materials, most of them specifically developed for Alabama, Arizona, California, Florida, Georgia, Indiana, Louisiana, Maine, Maryland, Minnesota, Mississippi, Nevada, New Jersey, North Carolina, Ohio, South Carolina, Tennessee, and Texas.

Company history

American Book Company was founded in 1996 by Dr. Frank Pintozzi, a professor of reading and English as a Second Language at Kennesaw State University, and Colleen Pintozzi, a math teacher and supervisor of General Educational Development programs.

They began writing textbooks for nearby South Carolina. After finding success, they created more books for states across the country.

Book Features

American Book Company books have frequent references to standards provided by state departments of education. Each book is based around multiple practice tests modeled after the relevant state test.

Many of the company's books include links to online modules curated by the National Science Teachers Association's sciLINKS program.

Validation Study

In 2006, publishing consultant Lois Eskin Associates studied the effects of using American Book Company books to prepare for standardized tests. The goal of the study was to find if students were more likely to pass standardized tests after studying with American Book Company books. The study included schools in Alabama, California, Florida, Georgia, Indiana, Louisiana, South Carolina, and Texas.

Results were positive, with every school showing success attributed to American Book Company. In particular, Tranquillity High School increased its pass rate on the CAHSEE by 135%.

Books Adopted by State Boards of Education
As of 2009, the following fourteen American Book Company books have been officially adopted by the Alabama and Georgia departments of education:

 Mastering the AL Direct Assessment in Writing: Grade 10 
 Mastering the GA CRCT 6th in Language Arts 
 Mastering the GA CRCT 6th in Reading 
 Mastering the GA CRCT 7th in Language Arts 
 Mastering the GA CRCT 7th in Reading 
 Passing the 7th Grade ARMT in Reading 
 Passing the 8th Grade ARMT in Reading 
 Passing the GA CRCT 3rd in Reading 
 Passing the GA CRCT 5th in Reading 
 Passing the GA CRCT 8th in Language Arts 
 Passing the GA CRCT 8th in Reading 
 Passing the GA Grade 8 Writing Assessment 
 Passing the New AL High School Graduation Exam in Language 
 Passing the New AL High School Graduation Exam in Reading 

American Book Company books are also listed as a resource by the New Jersey Department of Education and schools in many states, including Minnesota, California, and Alabama.

Other Ventures

American Book Company offers online practice testing and classroom management software.

It has also recently begun making brief web video lessons.

Its community involvement includes working with Adopt-a-Book, Must Ministries, and Habitat for Humanity, among other organizations.

References

External links 

Book and flash cards samples at Scribd
TeacherTube profile

Educational publishing companies of the United States
Academic publishing companies
Educational book publishing companies
Educational software companies
Test preparation companies
Book publishing companies based in Georgia (U.S. state)
Publishing companies established in 1996
Education in Cherokee County, Georgia
Privately held companies based in Georgia (U.S. state)
American companies established in 1996